Ruby Bhatia (born November 1, 1973) is a Canadian actress, VJ, and television show host.

Early life and background
Bhatia was born to  Canada-based Harbans and Premlata Bhatia. But she was adopted at the age of 3 years by her aunt and uncle, Prem Krishan and Saroj Bhatia. She was raised in a small town Ajax, Ontario, a suburb of Toronto, where she studied at Archbishop Denis O'Connor Catholic High School . She studied ballet, tap, jazz and modern dance from the Toronto branch of the Royal Academy of Dance, London. She had given dance exams up to Level 4, which is to dance what a bachelor's degree is to education. Her parents also taught her Indian dance informally at home.

Career
Bhatia won the Miss India Canada contest in 1993 and shifted to India in 1994, when she participated in Femina Miss India. She went on to become a VJ for Channel V. She also hosted BPL Oye! and Filmfare Awards.

She also co-hosted the Miss World 1996 held at Bangalore with Richard Steinmetz. In 1997, she made her television debut with Yeh Hai Raaz but quit the show midway being replaced by Deepti Bhatnagar.

Later, she appeared in several Hindi serials such as Kasautii Zindagii Kay as well as in movies.

Personal life
Bhatia was first married to singer Nitin Bali for three years, before getting divorced in 1999. In December 2009, she married Ajit S. Dutta.

Filmography

Films
2001 Chori Chori Chupke Chupke as News reporter
2002 Bollywood Bound as herself
2003 Main Prem Ki Diwani Hoon as Herself
2008 Halla Bol

Television
1997 Yeh Hai Raaz
1999-2000 Dance Mastiyaan
2004 Tamanna House as Tamanna
2002-2003 Kasautii Zindagii Kay as Menaka Bose

References

External links

1973 births
Living people
People from Ajax, Ontario
Canadian women television hosts
Canadian television hosts
Canadian television actresses
Punjabi people
Punjabi women
Canadian actresses of Indian descent
Canadian people of Indian descent
Canadian people of Punjabi descent
Canadian emigrants to India
Canadian expatriate actresses in India
Actresses in Hindi cinema
Actresses in Hindi television
Canadian VJs (media personalities)
Masters of ceremonies
20th-century Canadian actresses
21st-century Canadian actresses